Edward Smith (May 1927 – September 2010) was a member of the Rhode Island House of Representatives from 1980 to 1994, representing District 92 in Tiverton. He served as Chairman of the RI Coastal Resources Management Council, Vice Chairman of Narragansett Bay Commission and Chairman of the R.I. Joint Legislative Committee on Environment and Energy.

A 30 year veteran of the U.S. Navy, Smith was one of a relatively small group of men to serve in combat positions in World War II, the Korean War and the Vietnam War. He was prime recovery officer for John Glenn and NASA’s 6 Friendship 7 capsule.

References and links 
RI General Election Results 1990
RI General Election Results 1992
Resolution Honoring Former State Representative Edward J. Smith

1927 births
2010 deaths
Democratic Party members of the Rhode Island House of Representatives
People from Tiverton, Rhode Island
20th-century American politicians